Torfin is an unincorporated community in Roseau County, in the U.S. state of Minnesota.

History
A post office called Torfin was established in 1907, and remained in operation until 1914. The community was named for Iver Torfin, county official.

References

Unincorporated communities in Roseau County, Minnesota
Unincorporated communities in Minnesota